Crusader Field is a ballpark located in Irving, Texas.  It is the home of the University of Dallas Crusaders.  It was opened in 1997.

References

Baseball venues in the Dallas–Fort Worth metroplex
Baseball venues in Texas
Dallas Crusaders baseball